Osbert John de Rozario (25 June 1924 – 28 February 2022) was a Singaporean field hockey player. He competed in the men's tournament at the 1956 Summer Olympics. De Rozario died in February 2022, at the age of 97.

References

External links
 
 

1924 births
2022 deaths
Place of birth missing
Field hockey players at the 1956 Summer Olympics
Olympic field hockey players of Singapore
Singaporean male field hockey players
People from Selangor
Malaysian emigrants to Singapore
Singaporean people of Portuguese descent
Singaporean emigrants to Australia